Elio Martusciello (born 23 November 1959, Naples, Italy) is an Italian experimental music composer and performer, principally on guitar and computer. He has studied photography  with Mimmo Jodice and visual art with Carlo Alfano, Armando De Stefano and Rosa Panaro. He is a self-taught musician/composer and teaches "electronic music" at Conservatory of Music, Napoli, Italy. His compositional aesthetics are derived from acousmatic issues, but in addition to acousmatic composition he composes for instruments and live electronics, sound installation, multi-media works, audiovisual art and computer music improvisation. He lives in Napoli, Italy.

Main collaborations 

He has worked with improvising musicians such as Ana-Maria Avram, Natasha Barrett, Eugene Chadbourne, Alvin Curran, Chris Cutler, Iancu Dumitrescu, Michel Godard, Tim Hodgkinson, Thomas Lehn, Lawrence D. "Butch" Morris, Jerome Noetinger, Tony Oxley, Roberto Paci Dalo, Evan Parker,  Giancarlo Schiaffini, Mario Schiano, Z'EV, and others.

Bands 
Ossatura 
 
with Fabrizio Spera and Luca Venitucci 
 
Schismophonia
  
with Mike Cooper 
 
Taxonomy 
 
with Graziano Lella and Roberto Fega 
 
Bindou ensemble
  
with Ana-Maria Avram, Chris Cutler, Rhodri Davies, Iancu Dumitrescu and Tim Hodgkinson 
 
Le pecore di Dante 
 
with Tim Hodgkinson 
 
DA
  
with Paganmuzak
 
Xubuxue
  
with Pietro D'Agostino, Marco Ariano and Gianfranco Tedeschi

Selected Discography and videography 
E. e M. Martusciello: meta-harmonies (Staalplaat, 1995)
    
Ossatura: dentro (Recommended Records, 1998)
  
Ossatura: verso (Recommended Records, 2002) 
  
Aesthetics of the machine (bowindo, 2003)
    
Unoccupied areas (Recommended Records, 2005)
  
Taxonomy: A Global Taxonomycal Machine (Ambiances Magnétiques, 2005) 
 
Taxonomy: 10 Taxonomical Movements (Ambiances Magnétiques, 2008)
 
To extend the visibility (Recommended Records, 2009)
 
Concrete songs (TiConZero, 2011)
 
BetweenUs: Chamber Rites (Die Schachtel, 2015)
    
Ossatura: Maps and Mazes (Recommended Records, 2016)
    
incise (em music, 2018)
    
The Ghost Album (em music, 2020)

See also

List of acousmatic-music composers
Electroacoustic music
Acousmatic music
Sound installation
List of free improvising musicians and groups
Sound art
Musique concrète
List of experimental musicians

External links 
Home page
Myspace

References 
 His biography on electrocd.com
CEMAT
Recommended_Records
Conservatory of Music G.P. da Palestrina
intervista a Elio Martusciello
XXI Musicale
sands-zine
L'estetica dei media - Mario Costa
estetica della macchina - Elio Martusciello
to extend the visibility
allaboutjazz

Musicians from Naples
Italian musicians
Living people
1959 births
Electroacoustic music composers